In mathematical analysis, epi-convergence is a type of convergence for real-valued and extended real-valued functions. 

Epi-convergence is important because it is the appropriate notion of convergence with which to approximate minimization problems in the field of mathematical optimization. The symmetric notion of hypo-convergence is appropriate for maximization problems. Mosco convergence is a generalization of epi-convergence to infinite dimensional spaces.

Definition 

Let  be a metric space, and  a real-valued function for each natural number . We say that the sequence  epi-converges to a function  if for each

Extended real-valued extension 
The following extension allows epi-convergence to be applied to a sequence of functions with non-constant domain.

Denote by  the extended real numbers. Let  be a function  for each . The sequence  epi-converges to  if for each 

 

In fact, epi-convergence coincides with the -convergence in first countable spaces.

Hypo-convergence 

Epi-convergence is the appropriate topology with which to approximate minimization problems. For maximization problems one uses the symmetric notion of hypo-convergence.  hypo-converges to  if

 

and

Relationship to minimization problems

Assume we have a difficult minimization problem 

  

We can attempt to approximate this problem by a sequence of easier problems

  

for functions  and sets .

Epi-convergence provides an answer to the question: In what sense should the approximations converge to the original problem in order to guarantee that approximate solutions converge to a solution of the original?

We can embed these optimization problems into the epi-convergence framework by defining extended real-valued functions

 

In this sense,

 

Epi-convergence is the weakest notion of convergence for which this result holds.

Properties 

Here,  is the epigraph of the function .
 In general, epi-convergence neither implies nor is implied by pointwise convergence. Additional assumptions can be placed on an pointwise convergent family of functions to guarantee epi-convergence.

References
 R. Tyrrell Rockafellar and Roger Wets,  Variational Analysis. Chapter 7 ; Vol. 317. Springer Science & Business Media, 2009. 
 Peter Kall, Approximation to optimization problems: An elementary review; Mathematics of Operations Research 19, pp. 9–18 (1986)
 Hedy Attouch and Roger Wets, Epigraphical analysis; Annales de l'IHP Analyse non linéaire  Vol. 6. 1989.

Mathematical series
Topology of function spaces
Convergence (mathematics)